Beloyarsky (masculine), Beloyarskaya (feminine), or Beloyarskoye (neuter) is the name of several inhabited localities in Russia.

Urban localities
Beloyarsky, Khanty-Mansi Autonomous Okrug, a town in Khanty-Mansi Autonomous Okrug; administratively incorporated as a town of okrug significance
Beloyarsky, Sverdlovsk Oblast, a work settlement in Beloyarsky District of Sverdlovsk Oblast

Rural localities
Beloyarsky, Saratov Oblast, a settlement in Novoburassky District of Saratov Oblast
Beloyarskoye, a selo in Beloyarsky Selsoviet of Shchuchansky District of Kurgan Oblast